Ricardo Concepcion Puno (4 January 1923 – 25 July 2018), also known as Ricardo Puno, Sr., was a Filipino lawyer, judge and jurist, and the Minister of Justice of the Philippines from 1979 to 1984.

Background
Puno was born on 4 January 1923 in Guagua, Pampanga and went by the nickname Carding. He attended the Ateneo de Manila University and Manuel L. Quezon University (MLQU). He went on to teach at MLQU, beginning a career of teaching law spanning decades and multiple institutions of higher education such as the Ateneo de Manila, the San Beda College of Law, San Sebastián College, Adamson University and the University of the Philippines (UP). He was also a partner at Ledesma, Puno and Associates until 1962.

Puno spoke Filipino, English and Spanish, besides his native Kapampangan.

Politics
Puno was a Member of Parliament (MP) for Region IV (Metro Manila) from 1978 to 1984, and served as Minister of Justice from 1979 to 1984.

Later life
In 1984, Puno resumed his work as a lawyer and founded Puno and Puno Law Offices (PunoLaw). He continued to lecture in law until 1991.

Puno was married to Priscilla Villanueva Puno, with whom he had twelve children. He died on 25 July 2018 after a lingering illness and is interred at the Heritage Park in Taguig.

References

1923 births
2018 deaths
Kapampangan people
People from Guagua
Ateneo de Manila University alumni
Manuel L. Quezon University alumni
20th-century jurists
Members of the House of Representatives of the Philippines from Metro Manila
Justices of the Court of Appeals of the Philippines
Secretaries of Justice of the Philippines
Ferdinand Marcos administration cabinet members
21st-century jurists
Burials at The Heritage Park